Sun or The Sun is the name of the following newspapers:

Australia 
 The Sun (Brisbane), formerly The Daily Sun, discontinued newspaper of News Limited
 The Sun (Sydney), a discontinued afternoon tabloid
 The Sun News-Pictorial, tabloid now merged into the Herald Sun

Burma 
 The Sun (Rangoon)

Canada 
Ordered by province
 Calgary Sun, Alberta
 Edmonton Sun, Alberta
 The Vancouver Sun, British Columbia
 Winnipeg Sun, Manitoba
 Brandon Sun, Manitoba
 Ottawa Sun, Ontario
 Toronto Sun, Ontario

Ceylon 
 Sun (Ceylon), a defunct Ceylonese newspaper

Hong Kong 
 The Sun (Hong Kong), a defunct Chinese-language newspaper
 The SUN (Hong Kong), an English-language newspaper for Filipinos

Hungary 
 The Budapest Sun

Malaysia 
 The Sun (Malaysia)

New Zealand
 The Sun (New Zealand)

Nigeria 
 The Sun (Nigeria)

United Kingdom 
 The Sun (United Kingdom), a current daily national tabloid
 The Sun (1792–1876), a defunct British newspaper 
 The Sun (1893–1906), a defunct British newspaper

United States 
Ordered by state
 The San Bernardino Sun, of California
 Sonoma Valley Sun, of California
 The Gainesville Sun, Florida
 The Baltimore Sun, Maryland
 The Sun (Lowell), Massachusetts
 St. Louis Sun, Missouri (1989–1990)
 Las Vegas Sun, Nevada
 The New York Sun (2002–2008)
 The Sun (New York) (1833–1950)
 Sun Newspapers, a chain of weekly newspapers in Ohio
 The Sun (Sheridan), Oregon
 The Westerly Sun, Rhode Island
 Grand Saline Sun, Texas
 Sun, merged with the News-Advocate in 1932 to form the Sun Advocate, Price, Utah
 Kitsap Sun, Washington
 The Sun, later called Peck's Sun, a Wisconsin newspaper founded by George Wilbur Peck
 Sun (supermarket tabloid) (1983–2012)

See also
 Daily Sun (newspaper)
 The Sunday Sun (disambiguation)
 Chicago Sun-Times, Illinois, United States
 Herald Sun, Melbourne, Australia
 Sun Herald, Biloxi, Mississippi 
 Sun-Sentinel, South Florida 
 The Sun News, a daily newspaper published in Myrtle Beach, South Carolina
 The Sun News-Pictorial, Melbourne, Australia
 Die Son (English: "The Sun"), a daily Afrikaans-language tabloid
 Le Soleil (French for "The Sun"), a list of newspapers